Nigel Cowie is a British banker, who lived in North Korea for two decades from 1995.

Early life
He was educated at the University of Edinburgh.

Career
He worked for Hongkong and Shanghai Banking Corporation before moving to North Korea.

North Korean official, Kim Chol-sam and Cowie created a shell company called "DCB Finance" to circumvent sanctions, help sell arms, and expand its nuclear weapons programme.

Cowie was also CEO of Daedong Credit Bank, which was placed under sanctions.

Cowie is a director of Phoenix Commercial Ventures Limited, a North Korean project finance company.

References

British bankers
Living people
Year of birth missing (living people)
Alumni of the University of Edinburgh
British expatriates in North Korea